The Battle of Goose Green was fought from 28 to 29 May 1982, by British and Argentine forces during the Falklands War. Located on East Falkland's central isthmus, the settlement of Goose Green was the site of an airfield. Argentine forces were located in a well-defended position, within striking distance of San Carlos Water, where the British task force had positioned themselves after their amphibious landing.

The main body of the British assault force was composed of the 2nd Battalion, Parachute Regiment (2 Para), commanded by Lieutenant-Colonel Herbert Jones. BBC Radio broadcast news of the imminent attack on Goose Green. Knowing that this had likely forewarned the Argentinian defenders, the broadcast resulted in immediate criticism from Jones and other British personnel.

After the attack began in the early hours of 28 May, the 2 Para advance was stalled by fixed trenches with interlocking fields of fire. Jones was killed during a solo charge on an enemy machine-gun post. The Argentinian garrison agreed to a ceasefire, and formally surrendered the following morning. As a result of their actions, both Jones and his successor as commanding officer of the battalion, Major Chris Keeble, were awarded medals: Jones received a posthumous Victoria Cross, and Keeble received the Distinguished Service Order.

Prelude

Terrain and conditions

Goose Green and Darwin are on a narrow isthmus connecting Lafonia, to the south, with Wickham Heights in the north. The isthmus has two settlements: Darwin to the north, and Goose Green to the south. The terrain is rolling and treeless, and is covered with grassy outcrops, as well as areas of thick gorse and peat bogs, making camouflage and concealment extremely difficult. The islands have a cold, damp climate. From May to August (which is winter in the southern hemisphere), the ground is saturated and frequently covered with salty water, making walking slow and exhausting, particularly at night. Drizzly rains occur two out of every three days, with continuous winds, and with periods of rain, snow, fog, and sun changing rapidly. Sunshine is minimal, leaving few opportunities for troops to warm up and dry off.

Background
The bulk of the Argentine forces on the islands were in positions around Port Stanley,  to the east of the isthmus and San Carlos, the site of the main British landings. An Argentinian force had been deployed to Goose Green and Darwin and they were supported by artillery, mortars, 35 mm cannons, and machine guns. British intelligence incorrectly indicated that the Argentine force presented possessed limited offensive capabilities and did not pose a major threat to the landing area at San Carlos. Consequently, the Goose Green garrison seemed to have no strategic military value for the British in their campaign to recapture the islands and the initial plans for land operations had called for Goose Green to be isolated and bypassed.

After the British landings at San Carlos on 21 May and while the bridgehead was being consolidated, British activities were limited to digging fortified positions, patrolling, and waiting; during this time Argentine air attacks caused significant damage to, and the loss of, British ships in the area around the landing grounds. These attacks and the lack of breakout by the landed forces out of the San Carlos area led to a feeling among senior commanders and politicians in the UK that the momentum of the campaign was waning. As a result, British Joint Headquarters in the UK came under increasing pressure from the British government for an early ground offensive for political and propaganda value. There was also UN pressure for a cease-fire and the UK government position was that the taking of the Darwin–Goose Green isthmus was imperative before any such cease-fire decision as it would allow British forces to control access to the entire Lafonia and thus a significant portion of East Falkland. On 25 May Brigadier Julian Thompson, ground forces commander, commanding 3 Commando Brigade, was ordered to mount an attack on Argentine positions around Goose Green and Darwin.

Argentinian defences
The defending Argentine forces, known as Task Force Mercedes, consisted of two companies of Lieutenant-Colonel Ítalo Piaggi's 12th Infantry Regiment (12IR); his third company (Company B) was still deployed on Mount Kent as "Combat Team Solari" and only re-joined 12IR after the fall of Goose Green airfield. The task force also contained a company of the Ranger-type 25th Infantry Regiment (25th Special Infantry Regiment or 25IR). Air defence was provided by a battery of six 20 mm Rheinmetall anti-aircraft guns, manned by air force personnel and two radar-guided Oerlikon 35 mm anti-aircraft guns from the 601st Anti-Aircraft Battalion. Both the 20mm and 35mm anti-aircraft cannon could also be used in a direct fire ground support role, and this was the case in the last stages of the fighting. There was also one battery of three OTO Melara Mod 56 105 mm pack howitzers from the 4th Airborne Artillery Regiment. Pucará aircraft, based at Stanley and armed with rockets and napalm could provide close air support. The total forces under Piaggi's command numbered 1,083 men.

Piaggi's role was to provide a reserve battle group (Task Force Mercedes) in support of other forces deployed to the west of Stanley and secondly to occupy and defend the Darwin isthmus as well as the Military Air Base Condor at Goose Green. He deployed the two companies in an all-round defence with A Company, 12IR the key to his defence; they were deployed along a gorse hedge running across the Darwin isthmus from Darwin Hill to Boca House. He deployed his recce platoon (under Lieutenant Carlos Marcelo Morales) as an advance screen forward of 12IR's A Company, towards Coronation Ridge, while 12IR's C Company were deployed south of Goose Green to cover the approaches from Lafonia. To substitute for the absent B Company, he created a composite company from headquarters and other staff and deployed them in Goose Green hamlet. 25IR's C (Ranger) Company (under Paratroop-trained First Lieutenant Carlos Daniel Esteban) provided a mobile reserve, from the schoolhouse in Goose Green. Elements were also deployed to Darwin settlement, Salinas Beach, and Boca House and the air force security cadets, together with the anti-aircraft elements, were charged with protecting the airfield. Minefields had been laid in areas deemed tactically important, to provide further defence against attack.

On paper Piaggi had a full regiment, but it consisted of units from three separate regiments from two different brigades, none of whom had ever worked together. 12IR consisted mostly of conscripts from the northern, sub-tropical province of Corrientes, while the 25IR Company was considered an elite formation and had received commando training. Some elements were well trained and displayed a high degree of morale and motivation (C Company 25IR and A Battery 4th Airborne Artillery Group); with Lieutenant Ignacio Gorriti of B Company 12IR remarking that "there was no need for speeches. From the beginning, we knew how important the Malvinas were. It was a kind of love; we were going to defend something that was ours." Other units were less well-motivated, with the 12th Regiment chaplain, Santiago Mora, writing:

The conscripts of 25th Infantry wanted to fight and cover themselves in glory. The conscripts of the 12th Infantry Regiment fought because they were told to do so. This did not make them any less brave. On the whole, they remained admirably calm.

Private Esteban Roberto Avalos fought in the Falklands as a sniper in 12IR's B Company. In all, some fifty hand-picked 12th Regiment conscripts and NCOs had received Ranger-type training from visiting Halcón 8 (Falcon 8) army commandos in 1981, and then returned to their respective companies:

In my particular case, I ended up being a sharpshooter for which I had been preparing since the time we were out in the field, where I had the opportunity to shoot with a FAL. During the 45 days we spent there, we had to practice shooting three or four times a week, and those moments were taken advantage of to learn the shooting positions and familiarize ourselves with the weapon. The dealings with the superiors, in general, were excellent, although if somebody screwed up, we all paid the price. The most common punishments were taking us to the showers at night, forcing us to do push-ups or demand from us heaps of frog leaps and crawling. If someone took the wrong step, for example, it was reasonable to be pulled out of training, and they would make you 'dance' a little with push-ups on the thistles or the mud. Now, going back to the subject of instruction, I would say that it was generally satisfactory, at least as far as our group was concerned, since we had basic training in the use of explosives and we were even given some classes in self-defence."

The Argentine positions were well selected, and officers well briefed. In the weeks before the British invasion, airstrikes, naval bombardment, their own poor logistic support and inclement conditions had contributed to the erosion of morale amongst conscripts. However, morale remained strong among the 4th Airborne Artillery Regiment gunners as well the officers, NCOs, and Ranger-trained conscripts of the 12th and 25th Regiments. On 19 May, an Argentine Air Force C-130 Hercules parachuted in eight tons of tinned provisions that significantly boosted the morale of Task Force Mercedes.

At the start of the battle, the Argentinian forces had about the same number of effective combatants as the British paratroopers.

British forces

Thompson ordered 2nd Battalion of the Parachute Regiment (2 Para) to conduct an attack on Goose Green, as they were the unit closest to the isthmus in the San Carlos defensive perimeter. He ordered Lieutenant-Colonel Herbert 'H' Jones, the commanding officer of 2 Para, to "carry out a raid on Goose Green isthmus and capture the settlements before withdrawing to be in reserve for the main thrust to the north." The "capture" component appealed more to Jones than the "raid" component, although Thompson later acknowledged that he had assigned insufficient forces to rapidly execute the "capture" part of the orders.

2 Para consisted of three rifle companies, one patrol company, one support company, and an HQ company. Thompson had assigned three 105 mm artillery pieces, with 960 shells from 29 Commando Regiment, Royal Artillery; one MILAN anti-tank missile platoon; and Scout helicopters as air support.

Attack plan
An SAS survey had reported that the Darwin–Goose Green area was occupied by one Argentine company. Brigade intelligence reported that enemy forces consisted of three infantry companies (two from 12IR and one from 25IR), one platoon from 8IR, plus a possible amphibious platoon together with artillery and helicopter support. Jones was not too perturbed by the conflicting intelligence reports and, incorrectly, tended to believe the SAS reports on the assumption that they were actually "on the spot" and were able to provide more accurate information than the brigade intelligence staff. Based on this intelligence and the orders from Thompson, Jones planned the operation to be conducted in six phases, as a complicated night-day, silent-noisy attack (see Map 1):

 C Company was to secure the start line, and then;
 A Company was to launch the attack from the start line on the left (Darwin) side of the isthmus;
 B Company would then launch their attack from the start line directly after A Company had initiated contact and would advance on the right (Boca House) side of the isthmus;
 Once A and B companies had secured their initial objectives, D Company would advance from the start line between A and B companies and were to take defence positions once having reached their objective.
 This would be followed by C Company, who would pass through D Company and neutralise any remaining Argentine reserves;
 C Company would then advance again and clear the Goose Green airfield and the settlements of Darwin and Goose Green would be secured by A and D companies respectively.

C Company and the Commando engineers moved out from the forming-up place at 22:00 on 27 May to clear the route to the start line for the other companies. A firebase (consisting of air and naval fire controllers, mortars, and snipers) was established by Support Company west of Camilla Creek, who were in position by 02:00 on the morning of 28 May. The three guns from 8 Battery, their crew, and ammunition had been flown into Camilla Creek House by 20 Sea King helicopter sorties after last light on the evening of 27 May.

Initial contact

As part of the diversionary raids to cover the British landings in the San Carlos area on 21 May the British conducted a naval bombardment and launched air attacks on Goose Green. In addition 'D' Squadron of the SAS mounted a major raid to simulate a battalion-sized attack on A Company 12IR, who were dug in on Darwin Ridge. The SAS raid was launched from their assembly point on Mount Usborne,

The Harriers met intense anti-aircraft fire during their attack. 
On the night of 26–27 May, two rifle platoons from Manresa's A Company mounted a retaliatory raid on the SAS positions on Mount Usborne, but on reaching the summit were surprised to find that the SAS had already vacated the feature. The next day Sub-Lieutenant Ernesto Orlando Peluffo on Darwin Ridge spotted British troops conducting reconnaissance patrols and with his 12IR platoon fired on the patrol with long-range machine-gun fire in the hours before the start of the attack.

Throughout 27 May, Royal Air Force Harriers were active over Goose Green. One of them, responding to a call for help from Captain Paul Farrar's C (Patrols) Company, was lost to 35mm fire while attacking Darwin Ridge. The preliminary fire, probing patrols and SAS raid, the Harrier attacks, the sighting of the forward British paratroopers, and the BBC announcing that the 2nd Battalion of the Parachute Regiment was poised and ready to assault Darwin and Goose Green the day before the assault alerted the Argentine garrison to the impending attack.

Battle

Darwin Parks

At 3:35am  opened fire, firing a total of 22 star shells and 135 rounds of 4.5" high-explosive shells during a 90-minute bombardment, signalling the start of the attack. The attacking British companies also received support from the gunners of 8 (Alma) Battery, who fired about 1,000 rounds mostly in the night action.

2 Para A Company, under command of Maj Farrar-Hockley, were first to advance after the completion of the preparatory fire from HMS Arrow (which was off-target and ineffective). They were to take Burntside House as their first objective. They came under fire from Argentinian positions close to the house but managed to reach the objective without any casualties, finding that it was occupied by four Falklanders and that the house itself had never been held by the Argentinean forces. They were instructed to wait at Burntside House, instead of exploiting their favourable position and advancing further.

B Company, under command of Major John Crossland, followed in the next phase of the attack and were to secure Burntside Hill and then to continue to Boca Hill. Where A Company had advanced down the left-side of the isthmus, B Company were to follow the coast on the right-side of the attack. After a significant delay, they advanced and initially encountered very little resistance. Approaching the hill, they exchanged fire with Argentine forces and on reaching the top of the hill, they found the positions empty. The Argentinian account states that the platoons of Sub-Lieutenants Marcelo Martin Bracco and Alejandro Garra from the 12th Regiment's A Company came under heavy probing fire and the platoons withdrew after the initial clashes. The 2nd Rifle Platoon (under Sub-Lieutenant Gustavo Adolfo Malacalza) from A Company fought a delaying action against the British paratroopers before taking withdrawing to new positions on Darwin Ridge. The Paras in No. 5 Platoon (under Lieutenant Geoffrey Weighell) from B Company were forced to use white phosphorus (WP) grenades after discovering their fragmentation grenades were largely ineffective in clearing trenches in the night action.

The Coronation Ridge position temporarily halted Major Philip Neame's D Company as they advanced between A and B companies. They encountered heavy fire from an Argentinean machine-gun which was attacked and silenced by two paratroopers, for which they would be awarded decorations for bravery. With this machine gun out of action, D Company were able to continue to clear the Argentine platoon position on Coronation Ridge (under 2nd Lieutenant Marcelo Bracco) but lost three men in taking the hill.

At around 7:30 am the 1st Rifle Platoon from the 25IR C Company, under the command of 2nd Lieutenant Roberto Estévez, received orders to counterattack against 2 Para's B Company. The Argentine platoon was able to block the British advance by taking up positions on Darwin Hill, from which, although wounded, Estévez started calling down fire support from Argentine 105mm artillery and 120mm mortars. This indirect fire held up the advance of 2 Para's A Company, especially as they were in open ground on the forward slope of the hill as they prepared to take up their advance once again. A Company was forced to take cover in the nearby trenches. Estévez continued to direct the Argentinean artillery fire until he was killed by sniper fire. 2nd Lieutenant Roberto Estévez and his radio operator, Private Fabricio Edgar Carrascul were both posthumously decorated for their actions Private Guillermo Huircapán from Estévez's platoon describes the morning action:

Lieutenant Estévez went from one side to the other organizing the defence until all at once they got him in the shoulder. But with that and everything, badly wounded, he kept crawling along the trenches, giving orders, encouraging the soldiers, asking for everyone. A little later, they got him in the side, but just the same, from the trench, he continued directing the artillery fire by radio. There was a little pause, and then the English began the attack again, trying to advance, and again we beat them off.

The British A Company assault had been stopped by fire from a 12IR platoon (under Sub-Lieutenant Ernesto Peluffo) after their platoon sergeant had observed the British approach and yelled out a warning. Major Farrar-Hockley then spotted Argentine reinforcements on the hills before him and shouted, "Ambush! Take cover!" just as the 12IR platoon's machine-guns opened fire. The Royal Engineer officer attached to Farrar-Hockley's company, Lieutenant Clive Livingstone, wrote about the initial fight for Darwin Hill:

A massive volume of medium machine-gun fire was unleashed on us from a range of about 400 metres. The light now rapidly appearing enabled the enemy to identify targets and bring down very effective fire. Although this too would work for us, the weight of fire we could produce was not in proportion to the massive response it brought. We stopped firing — our main concern was to move away whenever pauses occurred in the attention being paid to us. The two platoons were not able to suppress the trenches, which were giving us so much trouble. We took about 45 minutes to extract ourselves through the use of smoke and pauses in the firing.

The A Company Paras were in the gorse line at the bottom of Darwin Hill facing the entrenched Argentines, who were looking down the hill at them. They were pinned down by heavy machine gun and automatic rifle fire as well as sniper fire for an hour, between 9 and 10 am. 2 Para's B Company also broke off their attacks and began to withdraw to the reverse side of Middle Hill and the base of Coronation Point. Their defence and the re-organisation of the attack was organised by 2 Para's second-in-command. The British A and B Companies could not get across the open ground to get at the Argentinean machine-guns and snipers and after five hours of fighting, their ammunition supply was becoming critical. Nevertheless, the paras with Spanish-speaking Royal Marines Captain Roderick Bell forward with them, using a loudspeaker called on the Argentines to surrender.

Death of H. Jones
With both A and B Companies advance halted and the entire attack in jeopardy, the 2 Para Commander, Lieutenant Colonel Jones led an unsuccessful charge up a small gully to try to regain the initiative. Three of his men, his adjutant Captain Wood, A Company's second-in-command Captain Dent, and Corporal Hardman, were killed when they followed his charge. Shortly after that, Jones was seen to run west along the base of Darwin Ridge to a small re-entrant, followed by his bodyguard. He checked his Sterling submachine gun, then ran up the hill towards an Argentine trench. He was seen to be hit once, then fell, got up, and was hit again from the side. He fell metres short of the trench, shot in the back and the groin, and died within minutes. Jones was posthumously awarded the Victoria Cross.

As Jones lay dying, his men radioed for urgent casualty evacuation. However, the British Scout helicopter sent to evacuate Jones was shot down by an Argentine FMA IA 58 Pucará ground-attack aircraft (this was to be the only Argentine air-to-air victory of the war). The pilot, Lieutenant Richard Nunn RM was killed and posthumously received the DFC, and the aircrewman, Sergeant Bill Belcher RM was severely wounded in both legs. While returning from this attack, the Pucará (A-537) crashed into Blue Mountain and its pilot, was killed. His remains were not recovered until 1986 and the cause of the crash remains unknown.

Jones' death was attributed to an Argentine Army commando sniper identified as Corporal Osvaldo Faustino Olmos.  However, historian Hugh Bicheno attributed Jones' death to Corporal José Luis Ríos of the 12th Regiment's Reconnaissance Platoon that had fallen back from the earlier fighting in Darwin Parks. Ríos was later fatally wounded manning a machine-gun in his trench by Abols, who fired a 66mm rocket.

With the death of Jones, command passed to Major Chris Keeble. Following the failure of this initial attack and the death of Jones, it took Keeble an additional two hours to reorganize and resume the attack. Former Para officer and military theorist Spencer Fitz-Gibbon wrote in 1995 that despite his undoubted courage, H. Jones did more to hinder than to help 2 Para, losing sight of the overall battle picture and failing to allow his sub-unit commanders to exercise mission command, before his fatal attempt to lead A Company forward from the position where they had become bogged down.

Darwin Hill 

By the time of Jones' death it was 10:30, and Major Dair Farrar-Hockley's A Company made a third attempt to advance, but this petered out. Eventually the British company, hampered by the morning fog as they advanced up the slope of Darwin Ridge, were driven back to the gully by fire from the survivors of the 1st Platoon from 25IR's C Company. During that morning's fighting 2 Para's mortar crews fired over 1,000 rounds to support the attacks, preventing the Argentines' fire from being properly aimed. Many of the Argentine fatalities during the fighting were caused by mortar fire.

The Argentineans requested close air-support and were expecting a strike by Argentine Air Force Skyhawk fighter-bombers in support of the Darwin Ridge defenders. Company Sergeant-Major Juan Coelho spread out white bedsheets in front of the trenches to mark the front line of Argentinean troops but was severely wounded in the process. On their approach to the islands the Argentine flight of five Skyhawks observed the British hospital ship Uganda and lost considerable time reporting and investigating the presence of the red-cross marked ship. The Skyhawk pilots, having lost much fuel and flying in bad weather, then carried out a poorly executed bomb run in support of the Darwin defenders but mistakenly attacked Argentine positions as they released their bombs. The Skyhawks were engaged by Argentine anti-aircraft fire that damaged the lead aircraft.

It was almost noon before the British advance resumed. A Company cleared the eastern end of the Argentine position and opened the way forward towards Goose Green settlement. Sub-Lieutenant Guillermo Ricardo Aliaga's 3rd Platoon of 8IR's C Company held Boca Hill but by 13:47 and after fierce fighting, the position was taken by Major John Crosland's B Company, with support from the MILAN anti-tank platoon.

About the time of the final attack on the Boca House position, A Company overcame the Argentine defenders on Darwin Hill, finally reporting taking it at 13:13 local time, and advanced to take Boca Hill. With 2nd Lieutenant Estévez killed and the other two platoon commanders (Sub-Lieutenants Peluffo and Aliaga) involved badly wounded, Corporal Osvaldo Olmos ordered the survivors of the rifle platoon from the 25th Regiment to wave a white T-shirt from a rifle and surrender, ending all resistance on the part of the Argentines holding Darwin Ridge. After securing Boca Hill, the battle for Darwin Ridge was over and the Paras had secured their interim objectives after six hours of fighting, with grievous loss: the commanding officer, the adjutant, A Company Second-in-Command, and nine non-commissioned officers and soldiers were killed and 30 wounded. Corporal David Abols later said that an Argentine sniper (Corporal Osvaldo Olmos) who killed or wounded seven Paras with head-shots during the morning fighting was mainly responsible for holding up the British battalion. "This sniper fire was responsible for the deaths of at least seven paratroopers, according to Abols – 'all headshots. That is the main reason A Company was stuck."

Attack on the airfield 

After securing Darwin Ridge, C and D Companies began to make their way to the small airfield, as well as to Darwin School (to the east of the airfield), while B Company made their way south of Goose Green Settlement. A Company remained on Darwin Hill. C Company took heavy losses when they became the target of intense direct fire from 35mm anti-aircraft guns from Goose Green. Private Mark Hollman-Smith, a signaller in the company headquarters, was killed by anti-aircraft fire while trying to recover a heavy machine gun from wounded Private Steve Russell. C Company's commander, Major Roger Jenner, his signaller and eight other men were also wounded. 

In the airfield itself, Argentine Air Force anti-aircraft gunners (under Lieutenant Darío Del Valle Valazza) from the 1st Anti-Aircraft Group (Grupo 1 de Artillería Antiaérea or G1AA) and the 12IR platoon under Sub-Lieutenant Carlos Oslvaldo Aldao, attempted to halt the renewed advance from Boca Hill, but eventually they were forced to abandon their positions, including the five remaining 20mm Rheinmetall guns at Cóndor airfield, having earlier lost one of these guns to naval shelling as well as the Elta radar to MILAN missiles or mortar fire. A large part of the 12IR platoon was overrun and forced to surrender, but Aldao, along with a corporal, managed to escape in the confusion of the Argentine airstrikes that materialised later that afternoon.With Lieutenant Valazza wounded in the fighting, Second Lieutenant Arnaldo Favre took over the 1st Anti-Aircraft Group and ordered the anti-aircraft gunners to destroy with hand grenades their 20mm anti-aircraft guns before withdrawing to Goose Green Settlment.

Private John Graham, from Lieutenant Chris Waddington's No. 11 Platoon, claimed that Lieutenant Barry and Corporal Sullivan, during a local truce, went forward to accept the Argentine surrender at the airfield and that the defenders suddenly opened fire without warning, killing Barry and wounding Sullivan, with one Argentine crawling forward to Sullivan and shooting him at point-blank range:
... I saw the white flag incident; I was in 11 Platoon. We were going up the hill, and the flag went up. The officer [Barry] called the sergeant [sic] and then got halfway up the hill. Bang! They let rip into them, Killed them. One guy [Corporal Paul Sullivan] was hit in the knee, and one of the bastards came forward and shot him in the head. He moved forward out of his position and shot him.

According to Sub-Lieutenant Gómez-Centurión:

I set out with thirty-six men toward the north. Passing the school, we entered a depression from which we saw the hill. I sent a scouting party ahead, and they told me that the British were advancing from the other side of the low ridge, some one hundred and fifty men. [My] men were very tense; there was a brutal cold; we shivered with cold, with fear. When they were about fifty metres away, we opened fire. We kept firing for at least forty minutes. They started to attack our flank, my soldiers had to take cover, the firing went down, and the situation started to become critical. Then we were surrounded, we had wounded, people started to lose control. I began to ask about casualties, each time, more casualties. There was no way out behind because we had been flanked, nearly surrounded. So when there was a pause in the firing, I decided that it was the time to stop, and I gave the order to disengage.

The 25IR platoon defending the airfield fell back into the Darwin-Goose Green track and was able to escape. Sergeant Sergio Ismael Garcia of 25IR single-handedly covered the withdrawal of his platoon during the British counterattack. He was posthumously awarded the Argentine Nation to the Valour in Combat Medal. Under orders from Major Carlos Alberto Frontera (second in command of 12IR), Sub-Lieutenant César Álvarez Berro's 12IR platoon took up new positions and helped cover the retreat of Gómez-Centurión's platoon along the Darwin-Goose Green track.

Four Paras of D Company and approximately a dozen Argentines were killed in these engagements. Among the British dead were 29-year-old Lieutenant Barry and two NCOs, Lance-Corporal Smith and Corporal Sullivan, who were killed after Barry's attempt to convince Sub-Lieutenant Gómez-Centurión to surrender was rebuffed. C Company did not lose a single man in the Darwin School fighting, but Private Steve Dixon, from D Company, died when a splinter from a 35mm anti-aircraft shell struck him in the chest. The Argentine 35mm anti-aircraft guns under the command of Sub-Lieutenant Claudio Oscar Braghini reduced the schoolhouse to rubble after sergeants Mario Abel Tarditti and Roberto Amado Fernandez reported to him that sniper fire was coming from the building.

At around this time, three British Harriers attacked the Argentine 35 mm gun positions; the army radar-guided guns were unable to respond effectively because a piece of mortar shrapnel had earlier struck the generator for the firearms and fire-control radar. This attack considerably lifted morale among the British paras. Although it was not known at the time, the Harriers came close to being shot down in their bomb run after being misidentified as enemy aircraft by Lieutenant-Commander Nigel Ward and Flight Lieutenant Ian Mortimer of 801 Squadron. According to Lieutenant Braghini's report, and at least one British account, the Harrier strike missed their intended target, but the Argentine antiaircraft guns were already out of action anyway.

Meanwhile, the 12IR platoon—under Sub-Lieutenant Orlando Lucero, a platoon that Lieutenant-Colonel Piaggi and Major Frontera had organised, using survivors from the earlier fighting—took up positions on Goose Green's outskirts and continued to resist, while supporting air force Pucará and navy Aermacchi aircraft struck the forward British companies. The Argentine pilots did not have much effect, suffering two losses: at 5:00, when a Macchi 339A (CANA 1 squadron) was shot down by a Blowpipe missile from the Royal Marines' air defence troop, killing Sub-Lieutenant Daniel Miguel.

Just about 10 minutes later, another Pucará was shot down by small arms fire from 2 Para, drenching several paratroopers with fuel and napalm, which did not ignite. Lieutenant Miguel Cruzado survived and was captured by British forces on the ground.

Situation at last light on 28 May
By last light, the situation for 2 Para was critical. A Company was still on Darwin Hill, north of the gorse hedge; B Company had penetrated much further south and had swung in a wide arc from the western shore of the isthmus eastwards towards Goose Green. They were isolated and under fire from an Argentinian platoon and unable to receive mutual support from the other companies. To worsen their predicament, Argentine helicopters—a Puma, a Chinook and six Hueys—landed southwest of their position, just after last light, bringing in the remaining Company B of 12IR (Combat Team Solari) from Mount Kent.

B Company managed to bring in artillery fire on these new Argentinean reinforcements, forcing them to disperse towards the Goose Green settlement, while some re-embarked and left with the departing helicopters. For C Company, the attack had also fizzled out after the battle at the school-house, with the company commander injured, the second-in-command unaccounted for, no radio contact, and the platoons scattered with up to 1,200 metres between them. D Company had regrouped just before last light, and they were deployed to the west of the dairy—exhausted, hungry, low on ammunition, and without water. Food was redistributed, for A and C Companies to share one ration-pack between two men; but B and D Companies could not be reached. At this time, a British helicopter casualty evacuation flight took place, successfully extracting C Company casualties from the forward slope of Darwin Hill, while under fire from Argentine positions.

To Keeble, the situation looked precarious: the settlements had been surrounded but not captured, and his companies were exhausted, cold, and low on water, food, and ammunition. His concern was that the Argentine 12IR B Company reinforcements, dropped by helicopter, would either be used in an early morning counter-attack or used to stiffen the defences around Goose Green. He had seen the C Company assault stopped in its tracks by the anti-aircraft fire from Goose Green, and had seen the Harrier strikes of earlier that afternoon missing their intended targets. In an order group with the A and C Company commanders, he indicated his preference for calling for an Argentine surrender, rather than facing an ongoing battle the following morning. His alternative plan, if the Argentines did not surrender, was to "flatten Goose Green" with all available fire-power and then launch an assault with all forces possible, including reinforcements he had requested from Thompson. On Thompson's orders, J Company of 42 Commando, Royal Marines, the remaining guns of 8 Battery, and additional mortars were helicoptered in to provide the necessary support.

Surrender
Once Thompson and 3 Brigade had agreed to the approach, a message was relayed by CB radio from San Carlos to Mr. Eric Goss, the farm manager in Goose Green—who, in turn, delivered it to Piaggi. The call explained the details of a planned delegation who would go forward from the British lines, bearing a message, to the Argentine positions in Goose Green. Piaggi agreed to receive the delegation. Soon after midnight, two Argentine Air Force warrant-officer prisoners of war (PW) were sent to meet with Piaggi and to hand over the proposed terms of surrender. The conditions read:

 That you unconditionally surrender your force to us by leaving the township, forming up aggressively, removing your helmets, and laying down your weapons. You will give prior notice of this intention by returning the PW under a white flag with him briefed as to the formalities by no later than 0830 hrs local time.
 You refuse in the first case to surrender and take the inevitable consequences. You will give prior notice of this intention by returning the PW without his flag (although his neutrality will be respected) no later than 0830 hrs local time.
 In the event and by the terms and conditions of the Geneva Convention and Laws of War, you will be held responsible for the fate of any civilians in Darwin and Goose Green, and we by these terms do give notice of our intention to bombard Darwin and Goose Green.

On receiving the terms, Piaggi concluded:
The battle had turned into a sniping contest. They could sit well out of range of our soldiers' fire and, if they wanted to, raze the settlement. I knew that there was no longer any chance of reinforcements from the 6th Regiment's B Company (Compañía B 'Piribebuy'). So I suggested to Wing Commander [Vice Commodore] Wilson Pedrozo that he talk to the British. He agreed reluctantly.
The next morning, an agreement for an unconditional surrender was reached. Pedrozo held a short parade, and those on show then laid down their weapons. After burning the regimental flag, Piaggi led the troops and officers, carrying their personal belongings, into captivity.

Aftermath

Impact on the campaign
In the week preceding the attack, the Argentinians had sunk four British ships, including the Atlantic Conveyor containing vital air-lift helicopters essential for the re-capture of Stanley. This led the British government to question the lack of movement by their ground-forces and London needed a sign of progress. The victory at Goose Green accomplished the political purpose of sustaining public support in Britain by a badly needed victory and the success marked a turning point in the campaign, as it emphasised the Argentine failure to thwart the establishment of a beachhead and subsequent breakout into the island. The Argentineans had counted on achieving at least a stalemate through air attacks and ground defences, if not stopping the landings altogether. From this point onwards, the British forces were to retain the initiative in all successive battles.

Prisoners and casualties

Between 45 and 55 Argentines were killed (57 according to Major Alberto Frontera, second-in-command of the 12th Regiment ) with 32 from RI 12, 13 from Company C RI 25, five killed in the platoon from RI 8, 4 Air Force staff, and one Navy service member  and 86 were recorded as wounded. 
The remainder of the Argentine force was taken prisoner with 140 Argentine wounded  evacuated to hospital ships via the medical post in San Carlos. Argentine dead were buried in a cemetery to the north of Darwin; military chaplain Mora and sub-lieutenants Bracco and Gómez-Centurión assisted burying the army dead with Second Lieutenant Arnaldo Favre from the 1st Anti-Aircraft Artillery Group tasked with collecting the air force dead. Prisoners were used to clear the battlefield. In an incident, while moving artillery ammunition, the 2nd Rifle Platoon (under Sub-Lieutenant Leonardo Durán) from RI 12's C Company was engulfed in a massive explosion that left 5 dead or missing and 10 seriously wounded. In an interview in April 2022, Durán clarified that the actual losses in the explosion were three men (Privates Rafael Barrios, Víctor Rodríguez and José Ramón Ferrau) killed and ten men (the officer along with Privates Raúl Vallejos, Ricardo Pinatti, Ángel Urban, Ricardo Jakuisuk, Gerardo Fernández, Luis Spinberger, Hugo Duarte, Francisco Ocampo and Martín Flores) wounded in his platoon.

After clearing the area, the prisoners were marched to, and interned in, San Carlos.

The British lost 18 killed (16 Paras, one Royal Marine pilot, and one commando sapper) and 64 wounded with nearly 50 requiring operations under general anaesthetic.
The seriously injured were evacuated to the hospital ship  much to the relief of 2 PARA's medical officer (Captain Steve Hughes) who thought that 47 badly wounded Paras had succumbed to their injuries at the British field dressing station in San Carlos.

By 3 June, the Gurkhas were deployed at Darwin and Goose Green. They were used in helicopter-borne operations to find Argentine patrols operating on the southern flank of the British advance to Port Stanley. This resulted in an encounter with a 10-man army–air force patrol (under Lieutenant Jaime Enrique Ugarte from the Argentine Air Force's 1st Anti-Aircraft Group, and Sergeant Roberto Daniel Berdugo from the 12th Regiment) that had been helicoptered to Egg Harbour House, an abandoned farmhouse in Lafonia, to shoot down British aircraft with SA-7 shoulder-launched missiles. On 7 June, a Sea King arrived with 20 Gurkhas to clear this outpost. On being ordered to lie down to be searched by the Gurkhas, all the wet and hungry Argentine soldiers, including Sergeant Berdugo, did so, except the air force officer. A Gurkha rifleman, brandishing a 10" Kukri blade, threatened the air force officer with beheading, then Lieutenant Ugarte obeyed.

Commanders

Lieutenant-Colonel Ítalo Ángel Piaggi surrendered his forces in Goose Green on the Argentinian National Army Day (29 May). After the war, he was forced to resign from the army, and faced ongoing trials questioning his competence at Goose Green. In 1986, he wrote a book titled Ganso Verde, in which he strongly defended his decisions during the war and criticised the lack of logistical support from Stanley. In his book, he said that Task Force Mercedes had plenty of 7.62mm rifle ammunition left, but had run out of 81mm mortar rounds; and there were only 394 shells left for the 105mm artillery guns. On 24 February 1992, after a long fight in both civil and military courts, Piaggi had his retired military rank and pay reinstated, as a full colonel. He died in July 2012.

Lieutenant-Colonel Herbert 'H' Jones was buried at Ajax Bay on 30 May; after the war, his body was exhumed and transferred to the British cemetery in San Carlos. He was posthumously awarded the Victoria Cross.

Major Chris Keeble, who took over command of 2 Para when Jones was killed, was awarded the DSO for his actions at Goose Green. Keeble's leadership was one of the key factors that led to the British victory, in that his flexible style of command and the autonomy he afforded to his company commanders were much more successful than the rigid control, and adherence to plan, exercised by Jones. Despite sentiment among the soldiers of 2 Para for him to remain in command, he was superseded by Lieutenant-Colonel David Robert Chaundler, who was flown in from the UK to take command of the battalion.

Awards and citations

Argentinean forces
• First Lieutenant Roberto Néstor Estévez: Posthumously awarded the Argentine Heroic Combat Valour Cross. He is buried at the Darwin Argentine Military Cemetery.

British forces
 Lieutenant-Colonel Herbert 'H' Jones was posthumously awarded the Victoria Cross for his actions during the battle.
 The Distinguished Service Order was awarded to Maj. C.B.P. Keeble, the Battalion second in command
 The Military Cross Was awarded to:
 Maj. J.H. Crossland: OC B Coy
 Maj. C.D. Farrar-Hockley: OC A Coy
 Lt. C.S. Connor: Recce Pl. Cmdr
 Distinguished Conduct Medal was awarded to:
 Cpl. D. Abols for his daring charges, which turned the Darwin Hill battle
 Sgt. J.C. Meredith, Pl Sgt, 12 Platoon, D Company
 Pte S. Illingsworth was posthumously awarded the DCM

Order of Battle

Argentine forces
Below data is from Adkin, Goose Green: A Battle is Fought to be Won unless specifically indicated by additional citations.

British forces
Below data is from Adkin, Goose Green: A Battle is Fought to be Won unless specifically indicated by additional citations.
Post-nominal letters refer to awards bestowed for actions during the Battle of Goose Green.

Comparative strengths 
Below data is from Adkin, Goose Green: A Battle is Fought to be Won unless specifically indicated by additional citations.

BBC incident
During the planning of the assault of both Darwin and Goose Green, the battalion headquarters were listening in to the BBC World Service, when the newsreader announced that the 2nd Battalion of the Parachute Regiment was poised and ready to assault Darwin and Goose Green. This caused great trepidation among the commanding officers of the battalion, with fears that the operation was compromised. Jones became furious with the level of incompetence and told BBC representative Robert Fox he was going to sue the BBC, Whitehall, and the War Cabinet.

Field punishments

In the years after the battle, Argentine army officers and NCOs were accused of handing out brutal field punishment to their troops at Goose Green, and other locations, during the war. In 2009, Argentine authorities in Comodoro Rivadavia ratified a decision made by authorities in Río Grande, Tierra del Fuego, announcing their intention to charge 70 officers and NCOs with inhumane treatment of conscript soldiers during the war.

There was, however, false testimony that was used as evidence in accusing the Argentine officers and NCOs of abandonment; and Pablo Vassel, who had denounced the alleged perpetrators, had to step down from his post as head of the human rights sub-secretariat of Corrientes Province. Other veterans were sceptical about the veracity of the accusations, with Colonel José Martiniano Duarte, an ex–601 Commando Company officer and decorated veteran of the Falklands War, saying that it had become "fashionable" for ex-conscripts to accuse their superiors of abandonment. Since the 2009 announcement was made, no one in the military, or among the retired officers and NCOs, has been charged, causing Vassel to comment in April 2014:

For over two years we've been waiting for a final say on behalf of the courts ... There are some types of crimes that no state should allow to go unpunished, no matter how much time has passed, such as the crimes of the dictatorship. Last year Germany sentenced a 98-year-old corporal for his role in the concentration camps in one of the Eastern European countries occupied by Nazi Germany. It didn't take into account his age or rank."

References

Footnotes

Citations

Sources 

 
 
 Andrada, Benigno (1983). Guerra aérea en las Malvinas. Ed. Emecé. . 
 
 
 
 
 
 
 
 
 Kenney Oak, David J. 2 Para's Battle for Darwin Hill and Goose Green. Square Press April 2006. .
 
 
 
 
 
 
 
 

1982 in the British Empire
1982 in the Falkland Islands
Battles involving Argentina
Battles involving the United Kingdom
Battles of the Falklands War
British Army in the Falklands War
Conflicts in 1982
May 1982 events in South America
Parachute Regiment (United Kingdom)